The historic county of Middlesex in south east England was represented in Parliament from the 13th century. This article provides a list of constituencies constituting the Parliamentary representation from Middlesex.

From early times the City of London and the rest of Middlesex had different sheriffs and other administrative arrangements. However apart from this the historic county was not divided, for administrative purposes, until 1889. In that year the urbanised east of the county became part of the new administrative county of London; administered by the London County Council. The less built up north and west of the county formed the administrative county of Middlesex; administered by Middlesex County Council.

In 1965 the Greater London Council was formed. Greater London absorbed the administrative county of London and surrounding territory, including almost all of the administrative county of Middlesex. The south west part of the historic county (then the Staines Urban District and the Sunbury on Thames Urban District but from 1974 the borough of Spelthorne) was transferred to the administrative county of Surrey. A smaller part of the historic county, in the Potters Bar area, was transferred to the administrative county of Hertfordshire. In 1995 the village of Poyle, which had been a small area in the north of Spelthorne, was transferred to Berkshire.

The first part of this article covers the constituencies wholly or predominantly within the area of the historic county of Middlesex, both before and after the administrative changes of 1889 and 1965. The second part refers to constituencies mostly in another historic county, which included some territory from the historic county of Middlesex. The summaries section only refers to the constituencies included in the first section of the constituency list.

List of constituencies
Article names are followed by (UK Parliament constituency). The constituencies which existed in 1707 were those previously represented in the Parliament of England.

In the distribution of seats in effect from 1974 to 1983 the official name of the Greater London seats included a London Borough prefix. In most cases this is not used in the article names. There were also instances when a distinctive constituency name had, at different periods, been prefixed by different borough names. In those cases the distinctive constituency name alone is usually used in the article name. See the notes column for further details.

Key to abbreviations:-
 (Type) BC Borough constituency, CC County constituency, UC University constituency.
 (Administrative County in Notes) B shire county of Berkshire, GL Greater London (from 1965), H administrative/shire county of Hertfordshire (from 1965), L administrative county of London (1889–1965), M1 historic county of Middlesex (to 1889), M2 administrative county of Middlesex (1889–1965), S administrative/shire county of Surrey (from 1965).

Constituencies wholly or predominantly in the historic county

Notes:-
 1 Not technically part of the administrative county of London, but it was surrounded by it and was not part of any other administrative county.
 2 This constituency is strictly the South Poplar division of Poplar. As 'Poplar South Poplar' would include the borough name twice, the official name of the constituency is referred to as 'South Poplar'. The existing article calls the seat 'Poplar South' (which is in the usual form for a borough constituency, but does not match the unusual official name of the seat). A redirect exists from the official name to the article name.

Constituencies mostly in another historic county

Note:-
 1 The constituency is in Greater London and mostly forms part of the historic county of Hertfordshire.  The seat was created in 1974, but it was not until the 1997 redistribution that it included part of the historic county of Middlesex.

Summaries

Summary of Constituencies by Type and Period

Summary of Members of Parliament by Type and Period

Results

Historical representation by party
A cell marked → (with a different colour background to the preceding cell) indicates that the previous MP continued to sit under a new party name.

1885 to 1918

1918 to 1950

1950 to 1974

See also
 Wikipedia:Index of article on UK Parliament constituencies in England
 Wikipedia:Index of articles on UK Parliament constituencies in England N-Z
 List of parliamentary constituencies in Islington
 List of parliamentary constituencies in London
 Parliamentary representation by historic counties
 First Protectorate Parliament
 Unreformed House of Commons

References
 Boundaries of Parliamentary Constituencies 1885-1972, compiled and edited by F.W.S. Craig (Parliamentary Reference Publications 1972)
 British Parliamentary Constituencies: A Statistical Compendium, by Ivor Crewe and Anthony Fox (Faber and Faber 1984)
 British Parliamentary Election Results 1832-1885, compiled and edited by F.W.S. Craig (The Macmillan Press 1977)
 The House of Commons 1509-1558, by S.T. Bindoff (Secker & Warburg 1982)
 The House of Commons 1558-1603, by P.W. Hasler (HMSO 1981)
 The House of Commons 1660-1690, by Basil Duke Henning (Secker & Warburg 1983)
 The House of Commons 1715-1754, by Romney Sedgwick (HMSO 1970)
 The House of Commons 1754-1790, by Sir Lewis Namier and John Brooke (HMSO 1964)
 The House of Commons 1790-1820, by R.G. Thorne (Secker & Warburg 1986)
 The Parliaments of England by Henry Stooks Smith (1st edition published in three volumes 1844–50), second edition edited (in one volume) by F.W.S. Craig (Political Reference Publications 1973) out of copyright

Middlesex, Historic county of
Political history of Middlesex